Bevin Brothers Manufacturing company (also called  Bevin Brothers) is a family-owned bell foundry located in East Hampton, Connecticut.

History
The company was found by brothers, William Bevin, Chauncey Bevin, and Abner Bevin in 1832. They were later joined by a fourth brother, Philo Bevin.

The business's website states it produced the first foot gong used in an automobile (the bell was patented in 1897).  The foot gong is a bell that was beneath the floor of early automobiles and was rung by pressing it with your foot.  It has since been replaced by the car horn.

Through the years more than 30 companies have made bells in East Hampton earning it the nickname of "Bell Town."  Bevin Brothers is the only remaining bell manufacturer in East Hampton and still remains in the Bevin family.

Through the years it has made sleigh bells, house bells, cow bells, sheep bells, door bells, and ship's bells.

On May 27, 2012, the factory was struck by lightning resulting in a devastating fire that razed the Bevin Brothers mill.  In the wake of the fire, Bevin Brothers' future as a bellmaker was uncertain.  At the time of the fire, the factory was reported to be the last company in the United States to solely produce bells, which it still claims to be, as of 2019.  At the time, it had 19 employees, and was reported to make 1.2 million bells in 200 varieties. As of 2019, it reportedly makes 50 types of bells.

Notable bells 

 All of the Salvation Army Christmas bells
 The bell used to indicate the start and finish of the New York Stock Exchange trading
 Boxing championship bells
 A bell aboard the U.S.S. Maine
 The bell used to signify an angel got its wings in the 1946 film It's a Wonderful Life
 The cowbell played by Will Ferrell in the Saturday Night Live sketch "More Cowbell"

See also 

 Matt Bevin

References

External links

1832 establishments in Connecticut
Companies based in Middlesex County, Connecticut
East Hampton, Connecticut
Historic American Engineering Record in Connecticut
Bell foundries of the United States
Manufacturing companies based in Connecticut